Silluvia elongata is a species of beetle in family Scarabaeidae. It was described by Landin in 1949.

References 

Scarabaeidae
Beetles described in 1949